Charles Baker (born 7 May 1947) is a New Zealand cricketer. He played in one first-class and two List A matches for Canterbury in 1971/72.

See also
 List of Canterbury representative cricketers

References

External links
 

1947 births
Living people
New Zealand cricketers
Canterbury cricketers
Cricketers from Christchurch